The 1956 NBA playoffs was the postseason tournament of the National Basketball Association's 1955-56 season. The tournament concluded with the Eastern Conference champion Philadelphia Warriors defeating the Western Conference champion Fort Wayne Pistons 4 games to 1 in the NBA Finals.

It was the Warriors' second NBA title; their first was in 1947 back when the NBA was known as the BAA. They would have to wait until 1975 to taste championship gold again; by that time they had moved to the Bay Area and become the Golden State Warriors. Philadelphia's later team, the Philadelphia 76ers, would win the title in 1967.

This was the Pistons' second straight trip to the NBA Finals, but they would not make another appearance until 1988 as the Detroit Pistons. No team from Indiana would return to the NBA Finals until the Indiana Pacers did so in 2000.

The play-in game between the Syracuse Nationals and the New York Knicks was the last play-in game to determine a playoff spot until 2020.

Bracket

Division Tiebreakers

Eastern Division Tiebreaker

New York Knicks @ Syracuse Nationals

Western Division Tiebreaker

Minneapolis Lakers @ St. Louis Hawks

Division Semifinals

Eastern Division Semifinals

(2) Boston Celtics vs. (3) Syracuse Nationals

This was the fifth playoff meeting between these two teams, with the Nationals winning three of the first four meetings.

Western Division Semifinals

(2) Minneapolis Lakers vs. (3) St. Louis Hawks

 George Mikan’s final NBA game.

This was the first playoff meeting between these two teams.

Division Finals

Eastern Division Finals

(1) Philadelphia Warriors vs. (3) Syracuse Nationals

This was the fourth playoff meeting between these two teams, with the 76ers/Nationals winning the first three meetings.

Western Division Finals

(1) Fort Wayne Pistons vs. (3) St. Louis Hawks

 Pistons become first team to come back after from a 2–0 deficit in NBA playoffs.

This was the first playoff meeting between these two teams.

NBA Finals: (E1) Philadelphia Warriors vs. (W1) Fort Wayne Pistons

This was the first playoff meeting between these two teams.

References

External links
Basketball-Reference.com's 1956 NBA Playoffs page

National Basketball Association playoffs
Playoffs

fi:NBA-kausi 1955–1956#Pudotuspelit